Ravenstown is also a nickname for Baltimore, Maryland.

Ravenstown is a settlement in the Lower Holker parish of the Cartmel Peninsula in Cumbria, England. The village is mostly a housing estate which was built during First World war to serve a new airship station built in the area. Ravenstown lies south of the larger village of Flookburgh and was historically part of Lancashire.

History
Ravenstown was built to serve an airship station for Vickers of Barrow-in-Furness after it was decided that Walney Airfield was deemed too vulnerable to attack from German U-boat attack so a new Airship station was constructed on a site which is now Cark Airfield.

A new village was needed to house the workers at the new airship station which was originally named Flookburgh Model Aero Village which is now Ravenstown in which construction of 250 houses started on 27 March 1917. The roads are named after World War I battles such as Somme and Jutland.

Transport
The main road running in and out of Ravenstown is Winder Lane which runs from Flookburgh and the village has an unmarked bus stop which is served by routes 530, 531 and 532.

The Furness Line runs close to Ravenstown and there is a station located in nearby Cark called Cark and Cartmel railway station.

Cark Airfield is located near to Ravenstown which is a small airfield for general aviation, the nearest airport with scheduled flights is Blackpool International Airport.

Governance
Ravenstown is part of the Lower Holker Civil Parish.

Ravenstown was originally part of Ulverston Rural District until 1960 when it was replaced with North Lonsdale Rural District. In 1974 Ravenstown became part of the newly formed district of South Lakeland, inside South Lakeland Ravenstown is part of the Holker ward and is represented by the Liberal Democrat Gill Gardner.

Originally Ravenstown was part of Lancashire before it was transferred to the new county of Cumbria in 1974. Inside Cumbria Ravenstown is part of the Cartmel ward and is represented by the Liberal Democrat Rod Wilson.

Ravenstown is part of the Westmorland and Lonsdale Constituency whose member of parliament is Tim Farron of the Liberal Democrats. Prior to Brexit in 2020 it was part of the North West England constituency in the European Parliament.

Media
The local newspapers covering Ravenstown are the North-West Evening Mail, The Westmorland Gazette and the free Grange Now.

The BBC Local Radio station covering Ravenstown is BBC Radio Cumbria and the Independent Local Radio station is Lakeland Radio. Ravenstown is covered by BBC North West and ITV Granada Regions.

References

Housing estates in England
South Lakeland District
Villages in Cumbria